

Events

February
 – Scheduled MRT Orange Line Phase 2 Western Extension opening.

May
 – Planned completion of the Stockton Diamond grade separation project.

September
  – São Paulo Metro Line 6 planned opening.

December
  – Planned opening of the cross-border Johor Bahru–Singapore Rapid Transit System.

Unknown date
 – Inland Railway completion.
 – Sydney Metro Western Sydney Airport line expected to start operation.
  – São Paulo Metro Line 2 extension to Penha station opening.
 – Quebec City Tramway opening.
 – Crown Bridges opening.
 – Tortona–Genoa high-speed railway expected completion.
 – Opening of the Tel Aviv Light Rail Purple Line.
 – MRL East Coast Rail Link opening, bringing  service.
 – Stage 6 of the Circle MRT line is expected to open to make a closed loop.
 – Janghang Line upgrading to 250 km/h.
 – Chungbuk Line upgrading to 230 km/h.
 – Slussenområdet intermodal terminal upgrading completion (started in 2016).
 – West Link projected opening
 – Sections of the West Coast Main Line, Midland Main Line, and Anglia to be equipped with ERTMS Level 2 signalling.
 – Earliest expected completion of the Docklands Light Railway extension to Thamesmead.
 – The Center City Connector is planned open, linking the two previously disconnected lines of the Seattle Streetcar system eight years after its initial planned opening before construction was temporarily halted.
 – The MARTA light rail Clifton Corridor is expected to begin operations, providing Emory University and several hospitals with rail service.
 – Texas Central Railway is expected to begin high speed service between Dallas and Houston.
 – Planned opening of the Inglewood Transit Connector, intended to link the city's sports venues to the Los Angeles Metro Rail system.
 – The segment of the Capitol Corridor running through the East Bay is planned to be rerouted over the Coast Line.
  – Planned opening of Maryland's Purple Line light rail after being delayed from 2022, though the public–private partnership's dissolution in 2020 will likely add further delays.
  – Expected date the San Joaquin and Altamont Corridor Express are to be extended to Natomas.
  – Expected date the Altamont Corridor Express is to be extended to Ceres.

References